Adrenalina may refer to: 

 Adrenalina (Finley album), second studio album by the Italian pop rock group Finley, including a single with the same name
Adrenalina 2, special edition of the second album Adrenalina by Finley
 "Adrenalina" (Senhit song), 2021 Senhit song featuring Flo Rida representing San Marino in the Eurovision Song Contest 2021
 "Adrenalina" (Wisin song), 2014 Wisin song featuring Ricky Martin and Jennifer Lopez
 Adrenalina (telenovela), a Chilean telenovela

See also
Adrenalina Caribe, Venezuelan Latin and Tropical music group
Adrenalina Skateboard Marathon 
Adrenaline, a common name for Epinephrine
Adrenaline (disambiguation)